= Tun Tun Aung =

Burmese bodybuilder

- Professional bodybuilder

Personal info
- Born: 1972 (age 53–54); Myanmar

Best statistics
- Weight: 60 kg (132 lb)

Professional (Pro) career
- Best win: gold medal; 2017

Tun Tun Aung (Burmese: ထွန်းထွန်းအောင်) is one of Myanmar's top professional bodybuilders and a personal trainer and winner of Mr Asia 2016.

At 2017, he won gold medals in Asian Bodybuilding and Fitness Championships from Bhutan. He received 2017 Myanmar Best Athlete Award.

== Career ==
He competed at World Bodybuilding and Physique Sports Championship in 2010. He was placed in the top 5.

In 2017, he was awarded gold medal in Asian Bodybuilding and Fitness Championships from Bhutan. And the next year, he was also awarded silver medal at 10th`World Bodybuilding And Physique Sports Championship in Chiang Mai, Thailand.

At 2019, he grabbed the silver medal with Nhin Nhin Aye at the Mixed Pairs Open event from Thailand.

== Competitive placings ==
- 2018 10th`World Bodybuilding And Physique Sports Championship
- 2017 Asian Bodybuilding and Fitness Championships
- Mr Asia 2016 (winner)
- 2016 World Bodybuilding and Physique Sports Championship(4th Runner Up)
- 2019 Mixed Pairs Open event
